The Discovery is the second studio album by American progressive metalcore band Born of Osiris. It was released through Sumerian Records on March 22, 2011. It is also the first Born of Osiris record to make use of seven string guitars, and was produced solely by members of the band. Early demo versions of some of the album’s songs were produced and mixed by Misha Mansoor but the final retail release was mixed by Jason Suecof.

The Discovery is the only release by the band to feature guitarist Jason Richardson as he would later get fired from the group in December of 2011. Most of the album's solos were written and performed by Richardson.

Track listing

Personnel
Born of Osiris
 Ronnie Canizaro – lead vocals
 Jason Richardson – lead guitar
 Lee McKinney – rhythm guitar
 David Da Rocha – bass
 Joe Buras – keyboards, synthesizers, backing vocals 
 Cameron Losch – drums

Production, recording and other staff
 Don Byczynski and Lee McKinney – engineering
 Jason Suecof – mixing
 Alan Douches – mastering
 Ash Avildsen – additional lyric writing, vocal production
 Cameron Gray – artwork

Charts

References 

2011 albums
Sumerian Records albums
Born of Osiris albums